World Assembly may refer to:

 World Assemblies of God Fellowship, an association of Pentecostal churches
 World Assembly of Muslim Youth, a youth organization from Saudi Arabia
 World Assembly of Youth, a representative body of youth organizations affiliated with the United Nations

See also 
 United Nations General Assembly
 World Conference (disambiguation)
 World Congress (disambiguation)
 World Council (disambiguation)